McDonald Yobe (born 11 September 1981) is a retired Malawian footballer who played as a midfielder or striker.

Career
Yobe was the first player to be transferred for 1 million kwacha when he moved from Telecom Wanderers to local rival Big Bullets. He played his last professional season for Ottawa Wizards in the Canadian Soccer League.

International career 
He also played for the Malawi national team.

Personal
He has retired from active football, and is a resident in Manchester where he plays for a local social team of diaspora Malawians. Yobe is married with two children.

References

1981 births
Living people
Canadian Soccer League (1998–present) players
Malawian footballers
Nyasa Big Bullets FC players
Ottawa Wizards players
Malawian expatriate footballers
Expatriate soccer players in Canada
Malawian expatriate sportspeople in Canada
Mighty Wanderers FC players
Association football forwards
Malawi international footballers